Methia lata is a species of beetle in the family Cerambycidae. It was described by Knull in 1958.

References

Methiini
Beetles described in 1958